Hugo Conrad von Hötzendorf (c. 1806 - 28 February 1869, Osijek) was a Croatian painter and art instructor of German ancestry.

Life and work 

Hugo Conrad von Hötzendorf was thought to be born sometime between 1806-1807. Little is known about his early life. His father came to Osijek from Brünn in 1806 to be a teacher and later, director of the local art school. From 1827 to 1835, Hugo and his brother Otto were also teachers at a school in Ruma.
In 1836, he went to study in Vienna, where he supported himself working for a landscaper. He remained there until 1840, when his father's illness forced him to return home. After his father's death, Hugo took over the management position at the art school in Osijek and remained there the rest of his life. Among his most prominent students were Izidor Kršnjavi and Adolf Waldinger.

In addition to the school, he maintained his own private art studio where he specialized in landscapes with peasants, soldiers and animals. In 1864, forty-two of his pencil drawings, depicting the ancient ruins and forests of Slavonia, were displayed at a major exhibition in Zagreb.

He died in 1869. A street in Osijek is named in his honor and is marked with a memorial bust.

Gallery

References

Further reading 
Ivo Šibalić: Poznati Osječani (Famous People from Osijek) in Osječki Dom, VI, 649, 6 - Osijek, 27–28. I. 2005.

External links
 
Kulturna Baština: Gallery of works by Hotzendorf

1869 deaths
Landscape painters
19th-century Croatian painters
Croatian male painters
19th-century Croatian male artists
Year of birth uncertain